California state elections in 2018 were held on Tuesday, November 6, 2018, with the primary elections being held on June 5, 2018. Voters elected one member to the United States Senate, 53 members to the United States House of Representatives, all eight state constitutional offices, all four members to the Board of Equalization, 20 members to the California State Senate, and all 80 members to the California State Assembly, among other elected offices.

Pursuant to Proposition 14 passed in 2010, California uses a nonpartisan blanket primary. All the candidates for the same elected office, regardless of respective political party, run against each other at once during the primary. The candidates receiving the most and second-most votes in the primary election then become the contestants in the general election.

United States Congress

Senate

Incumbent Democrat Dianne Feinstein won re-election.

House of Representatives

Statewide constitutional offices

Governor

Incumbent Democrat Jerry Brown was term-limited and was succeeded by Democratic Lieutenant Governor Gavin Newsom.

Lieutenant Governor

Incumbent Democrat Gavin Newsom was term-limited and was succeeded by the Democratic former United States Ambassador to Hungary Eleni Kounalakis.

Attorney General

Incumbent Democrat Xavier Becerra won his first election after his appointment and confirmation to the office on January 24, 2017.

Secretary of State

Incumbent Democrat Alex Padilla won re-election.

Treasurer

Incumbent Democrat John Chiang left office to run for governor and was succeeded by Democratic State Board of Equalization member Fiona Ma.

Controller

Incumbent Democrat Betty Yee won re-election.

Insurance Commissioner

Incumbent Democrat Dave Jones was term-limited and was succeeded by Democratic state senator Ricardo Lara.

Superintendent of Public Instruction

Incumbent Tom Torlakson was term-limited and was succeeded by Democratic state assemblymember Tony Thurmond.

Board of Equalization

District 1
Incumbent Republican George Runner was term-limited and was succeeded by Republican state senator Ted Gaines.

District 2
Incumbent Democrat Fiona Ma left office to run for state treasurer and was succeeded by Democratic San Francisco supervisor Malia Cohen.

District 3
Incumbent Democrat Jerome Horton was term-limited and was succeeded by Democratic Santa Monica city councilmember Tony Vazquez.

District 4
Incumbent Republican Diane Harkey left office to run for the United States House of Representatives and was succeeded by Democratic former San Diego city councilmember and perennial candidate Mike Schaefer.

State Legislature

State Senate

State Assembly

Statewide ballot propositions

June primary election
Since the passage of a law in November 2011, state primary elections may only feature propositions placed on the ballot by the state legislature.

 Proposition 68 - Passed
 A $4 billion bond measure to fund various parks, natural resources protection, climate adaptation, water quality and supply, and flood protection projects. Proponents argued that these projects will ensure and protect water resources, even during times of droughts. Opponents worried about adding more bonds to California's already existing debt.

 Proposition 69 - Passed
 A state constitution amendment that mandates that revenues generated by the Road Repair and Accountability Act of 2017 can only be used for transportation purposes. Proponents argued that this will prevent the state legislature from redirecting these funds to non-transportation programs. Opponents argued that this will not fix or build new roads, nor would it protect gas tax revenues.

 Proposition 70 - Failed
 A state constitution amendment that would have required that revenue from cap and trade programs be collected in a special fund starting in 2024. The state legislature would then need a two-thirds majority vote to spend this money. Proponents argued that this will ensure that the state legislature will spend these funds wisely on high priority projects. Opponents argued that this will empower anti-environmental special interest groups because a two-thirds majority vote requirement will lead to more legislative gridlock.

 Proposition 71 - Passed
 A state constitution amendment to move the effective date of passed ballot measures from the day after the election to the fifth day after the Secretary of State certifies the results. Proponents wanted to make sure that future election results are officially certified before ballot measures go into effect. Opponents worried that this will prevent future ballot measures from retroactively taking effect, because there may be a scenario where a voter-approved ballot measure may need to be enforced as soon as possible.

 Proposition 72 - Passed
 A state constitution amendment to exclude rainwater capture systems completed on or after January 1, 2019 from property tax assessments. Proponents wanted more homeowners to install these systems to help conserve water, and not get taxed on them. There was no opposing argument submitted to the Secretary of State.

November general election
 Proposition 1 – Passed
 Veterans and Affordable Housing Bond Act of 2018. This mandatory proposition, placed by the state legislature and the Governor, will authorize $4 billion in bonds to fund various veterans' home loans and affordable housing programs. Supporters want such affordable housing, while opponents argue that there are better alternative solutions.

 Proposition 2 – Passed
  No Place Like Home Act of 2018. This mandatory proposition, placed by the state legislature and the Governor, will allow revenue generated by 2004's Proposition 63, the 1 percent tax on incomes above $1 million, be used for $2 billion in bonds for homelessness prevention housing. Supporters say that this will help people get off the street, while opponents argue that diverting Prop. 63 revenue from the state's public mental health system may actually increase the homelessness.

 Proposition 3 – Failed
 Authorizes Bonds to Fund Projects for Water Supply and Quality, Watershed, Fish, Wildlife, Water Conveyance, and Groundwater Sustainability and Storage. Initiative Statute. Authorizes $8.877 billion in bonds to fund such infrastructure projects. Supporters favor funding such water projects, while opponents argue that it is not worth adding more bond debt if it is not going to produce new, usable water.

 Proposition 4 – Passed
 Authorizes $1.5 billion in bonds to funding construction at various hospitals providing children’s health care. Initiative Statute. Authorizes $1.5 billion in bonds to fund grants for construction and improvements at various children's hospitals. supporters favor such new hospital projects, while opponents would rather look for better ways to improve the state's overall health care system. 

 Proposition 5 – Failed
 Changes Requirements for Certain Property Owners to Transfer Their Property Tax Base to Replacement Property. Initiative Constitutional Amendment and Statute. Will amend 1978's Proposition 13 by allowing homeowners who are over 55 years old or severely disabled to transfer their property tax base from their old home to their new one, regardless of the new residence's property value, location, or their previous transfers. Supporters want to make it easier for seniors and the severely disabled when they move to a new residence, while opponents worry that public programs and services could be cut as a result of the potential loss of up to $1 billion of tax revenue.

 Proposition 6 – Failed
 Eliminates Recently Enacted Road Repair and Transportation Funding by Repealing Revenues Dedicated for those Purposes. Requires any Measure to Enact Certain Vehicle Fuel Taxes and Vehicle Fees be Submitted to and Approved by the Electorate. Initiative Constitutional Amendment. Repeals the fuel tax increases and vehicle fees under the Road Repair and Accountability Act of 2017. Any future increases would then require a mandatory proposition placed on the ballot. Supporters feel that the fuel taxes and vehicle fees are unfairly regressive, while opponents worry about the safety of roads and bridges if they do not get properly maintained.

 Proposition 7 – Passed
 Daylight Saving Time. This mandatory proposition, placed by the state legislature and the Governor, will repeal 1949's Proposition 12, allowing the state legislature to enact permanent daylight saving time, subject to approval by the U.S. Congress. Supporters cite the public health and safety drawbacks of the biannual time changes, while opponents say that it is not worth it having people, especially school children, having to walk in the dark in the morning during the winter months.

 Proposition 8 – Failed
 Authorizes State Regulation of Kidney Dialysis Clinics. Limits Charges for Patient Care. Initiative Statute. Among other requirements, mandates that kidney dialysis clinics issue refunds to their patients if their revenue exceeds 115 percent of their costs of direct patient care and health care quality improvements. Supporters want to protect patients from higher fees and from being overcharged, while opponents worry that these stricter requirements will force the closure of many of these clinics.

 Proposition 9 - Removed from the ballot by order of the California Supreme Court
  Division of California into Three States. Initiative Statute. Also known as the Cal 3 measure, this would have divided California into three U.S. states, subject to approval by the U.S. Congress. It was removed from the ballot by the California Supreme Court on July 18, 2018, for further legal review. In September, the court affirmed their removal of the measure along with banning any such measure to be on the ballot in the future.

 Proposition 10 – Failed
 Expands Local Governments’ Authority to Enact Rent Control on Residential Property. Initiative Statute. Repeals the Costa–Hawkins Rental Housing Act of 1995, lifting its limits on municipal rent control ordinances. Supporters argue that more local control will preserve affordable rents, while opponents worry that this will increase the local bureaucracy by allowing them to also regulate single-family homes and to also potentially add fees on top of the rents.

 Proposition 11 – Passed
 Requires Private-Sector Emergency Ambulance Employees to Remain on Call During Work Breaks. Changes Other Conditions of Employment. Initiative Statute. Among other requirements, would require private-sector emergency ambulance employees to remain on call during breaks, be trained in certain emergency situations, and receive paid mental health services from their employers. Supporters argue that these changes will help save lives during disasters and emergencies. There was no opposing argument submitted to the Secretary of State.

 Proposition 12 – Passed
 Establishes New Standards for Confinement of Certain Farm Animals; Bans Sale of Certain Non-Complying Products. Initiative Statute. Requires meats and eggs be produced from farm animals that are confined in areas greater than a specific amount of space. Any eggs and uncooked meat from animals not housed under these requirements would then be banned from being sold in the state. Supporters hope that this will help further stop animal cruelty on these farms. Opponents state that this legalizes cages until at least 2022, and claim some of the specific space regulations (such as only allowing a single square foot of space per hen) are not exactly animal-friendly.

See also
Mister America, a fictional film about the 2018 election for district attorney of San Bernardino County

References

External links
California Elections and Voter Information from the California Secretary of State
Candidates at Vote Smart 
Candidates at Ballotpedia
Campaign finance at OpenSecrets

Official Board of Equalization District 1 campaign websites
Ted Gaines (R) for Board of Equalization
Tom Hallinan (D) for Board of Equalization

Official Board of Equalization District 2 campaign websites
Mark Burns (R) for Board of Equalization
Malia Cohen (D) for Board of Equalization

Official Board of Equalization District 3 campaign websites
G. Rick Marshall (R) for Board of Equalization
Tony Vazquez (D) for Board of Equalization

 
California
Articles containing video clips